The 2018 Palarong Pambansa was the 61st edition of the Palarong Pambansa multi-sports event and was held in Vigan, Ilocos Sur from April 15 to 21, 2018. Student athletes from 17 athletic associations representing the 17 regions of the Philippines competed in different sporting events and disciplines.

Bidding
The cities of Baguio, Iligan, Vigan and the province of Bukidnon made a bid to host the 61st Palarong Pambansa. In 2017, Vigan was selected host of the Games. In January 2018, the Department of Education and the provincial government of Ilocos Sur signed a memorandum of agreement regarding the hosting of the games to be held primarily in Vigan.

The Games
The opening ceremony of the 2018 Palarong Pambansa was held at the Quirino Stadium in Bantay, Ilocos Sur on April 15, 2018. Philippine President Rodrigo Duterte was the guest speaker of the event for the second consecutive year. Duterte stated that the event is a breeding ground for future sports icons and nation-builders, "whose values and principles are founded on perseverance, discipline, teamwork, integrity, and love of country".

Sports personalities including chess grandmaster Eugene Torre, cue artist Efren "Bata" Reyes, bowler Paeng Nepomuceno, swimmer Eric Buhain, long jumper Elma Muros, 1996 Summer Olympics silver medalist Mansueto Velasco, 2014 Youth Olympic Games gold medalist Luis Gabriel Moreno and 2016 Summer Olympics silver medalist Hidilyn Diaz led the carrying of the giant Philippine flag. Moreno then lit the friendship cauldron using an arrow shot, symbolizing the commencement of the games.

Lydia de Vega-Mercado, considered as Asia's fastest woman in the 1980s, was honored as the Palarong Pambansa Lifetime Achievement Awardee during the opening rites. Her daughter, Stephanie represented her in the event.

On the second day of the Games on 16 April 2018, barefoot runner Lheslie de Lima from Camarines Sur won the first gold medal of the event in the 3,000 meter run (secondary girls category). She dedicated the win to her distant relative Senator Leila de Lima, who is currently in prison.

At the final day of the Games on April 21, 2018, the National Capital Region capped off their campaign with their 14th straight-overall championship, winning 100 gold, 70 silver and 50 bronze medals. Calabarzon and Western Visayas ended up with 1st and 2nd runner-up finishes, respectively.

Sports

Regular Sports
These are the regular sports disciplines that were played in the games.

Demonstration sports
These are the seven demonstration sports played at this year's Palarong Pambansa.

Special Para Games
These are the four para sports that were contested at this year's Palarong Pambansa.

 Swimming
 Bocce
 Goalball
 Athletics

Participating regions
A total of 17 athletic associations coming from 17 regions of the country participated in the athletic meet. The provinces of Negros Occidental and Negros Oriental which competed under the Negros Island Region in the previous two editions of the games (2016 Palarong Pambansa and 2017 Palarong Pambansa) will now compete and merge with their previous original regions, Western Visayas and Central Visayas respectively, after the Negros Island Region which was created in 2015 was dissolved by President Rodrigo Duterte.

Playing Venues 
At least 34 different locations in various towns across Ilocos Sur and its capital city Vigan were selected as the playing venues for the 26 sports disciplines of the games.

Billeting Areas

Athletic Delegations

Several public and private elementary, secondary and tertiary schools, colleges and universities situated at the provincial capital Vigan and nearby towns were selected as the billeting areas for delegates and officials of the games.

CS - central school, NCS - north central school, SCS - south central school, ES - elementary school, IS - integrated school, NHS - national high school.

Technical Officials and Referees

Official Medal Tally

Regular Games

Demo Sports

Para Games

References

2018
Palarong Pambansa
Palarong Pambansa
Culture of Ilocos Sur
April 2018 sports events in the Philippines